The 1949 Fordham Rams football team represented Fordham University as an independent during the 1949 college football season. The Army Cadets hosted Vince Lombardi's former team, the Fordham Rams at Michie Stadium. One of the members of the Rams was Vince's brother, Joe Lombardi, who transferred to the school after Lombardi left. Tim Cohane, writer of Look magazine was a Fordham alumnus, and a friend of Army coach Earl Blaik. He pressured both teams to play each other. Cohane felt the game would help Fordham rise to national prominence. Herb Seidell, the Fordham captain, lost a tooth in the game. Several fights ensued and the media named the match, the Donnybrook on the Hudson. There were multiple penalties for unnecessary roughness.

Schedule

References

Fordham
Fordham Rams football seasons
Fordham Rams football